Vrhtrebnje is a village in the Municipality of Trebnje in eastern Slovenia. It lies in the hills south of Trebnje. The area is part of the historical region of Lower Carniola. The municipality is now included in the Southeast Slovenia Statistical Region.

The local church is dedicated to Saint James and belongs to the Parish of Trebnje. It dates to the 16th century.

References

External links
Vrhtrebnje at Geopedia

Populated places in the Municipality of Trebnje